Reinhard Jahn (born 21 December 1950) is a German biophysicist and neurobiologist known for his studies of cellular membrane fusion. For these investigations, he has been honored with numerous awards, including the 2000 Leibniz Award. Jahn is currently Director at the Max Planck Institute for Biophysical Chemistry and the President of the University of Göttingen in Göttingen, Germany.

Early life and education
Reinhard Jahn was born in Leverkusen, Germany in 1950. He moved to Göttingen to study biology and biochemistry. Working in the lab of Hans-Dieter Söling, in 1981 he received a PhD from the University of Göttingen.

Career and research
Dr. Jahn moved to New York City to work as a postdoc in the lab of Paul Greengard, where he went on to become an Assistant Professor at The Rockefeller University. In 1986 he returned to Germany as a Junior Group Leader at the Max Planck Institute of Biochemistry in Munich. In 1991 he moved to New Haven to join the faculty at the Yale School of Medicine, where he became a Howard Hughes Medical Institute Investigator. He was recruited back to his alma mater to become Director at the Max Planck Institute for Biophysical Chemistry, position which he holds currently. In 2019 he was additionally elected as President of the University of Göttingen.

Awards and honors
 1990: Max Planck Research Award
 2000: Leibniz Prize
 2004: Member of the Leopoldina
 2006: Ernst Jung Prize
 2008: Sir Bernard Katz Prize
 2010: Lower Saxony Science Award
 2014: Heinrich Wieland Prize
 2015: Foreign associate of the National Academy of Sciences (United States)
 2015: Member of the Academia Europaea
 2015: Full member of the Göttingen Academy of Sciences and Humanities
 2016: Communitas Prize of the Max Planck Society
 2016: Balzan Prize

References 

1950 births
Living people
Foreign associates of the National Academy of Sciences
German biochemists
Howard Hughes Medical Investigators
Members of Academia Europaea
Members of the German Academy of Sciences Leopoldina
University of Göttingen alumni
Max Planck Institute directors